Thomas Pichon (30 March 1700 – 22 November 1781), also known as Thomas Tyrell, was a French government agent during Father Le Loutre's War. Pichon is renowned for betraying the French, Acadian and Mi’kmaq forces by providing information to the British, which led to the fall of Beauséjour. He has been referred to as "The Judas of Acadia."

Father Le Loutre's War 

Death and legacy 

Pichon retreated to London in 1757, where he entered on an affair with the French novelist Jeanne-Marie Leprince de Beaumont, whose marriage had been annulled.  Never a master of the English language, in 1769 he moved to Saint Helier, Jersey (a remnant of the Norman conquest where French was spoken), in which place he died on 22 November 1781.

Pichon left behind a very large collection of documents. They are held by the Bibliothèque municipale de Vire, in Normandy, France. His 1760 book on Cape Breton Island—Genuine letters and memoirs relating to the natural, civil, and commercial history of the islands of Cape Breton and Saint John : from the first settlement there, to the taking of Louisbourg by the English in 1758—published in both English and French shortly after the conquest of Louisbourg in 1758, was the first such history of that island.

Pichon has been called repeatedly Le Judas de l'Acadie by a 20th-century French-Canadian priest-historian, and elsewhere his conduct has been uniformly deplored. Between 2012 and 2015, historian and novelist A. J. B. Johnston made Pichon the central character is a series of three novels.

See also 

Military history of Nova Scotia
Military history of the Acadians

Notes

References

Texts 
Thomas Pichon – Dictionary of Canadian Biography
Thomas Pichon. Lettres et mémoires pour servir à l'histoire naturelle, civile et politique du Cap Breton, depuis son établissement jusqu'à la reprise de cette Isle par les Anglois en 1758, La Haye, Pierre Gosse / Londres, John Nourse, 1760, [New York, Johnson Reprint, 1966].
Genuine letters and memoirs relating to the natural, civil, and commercial history of the islands of Cape Breton and Saint John : from the first settlement there, to the taking of Louisbourg by the English in 1758
Geneviève Artigas-Menant, Lumières clandestines : les papiers de Thomas Pichon, Paris, Honoré Champion, 2001 ;
Geneviève Artigas-Menant, « Un Français chez les Micmacs en 1752 : Thomas Pichon », Studies on Voltaire and the Eighteenth Century, 1992 ; 305: pp. 1593–97 ;
 John Clarence, Webster ; Alice de Kessler Lusk Webster, Thomas Pichon, “the spy of Beausejour,” an account of his career in Europe and America, Sackville, N.B., Tribune Press, 1937.
[L.-T. Jacau de Fiedmont], The siege of Beauséjour in 1755; a journal of the attack on Beauséjour . . ., ed. J. C. Webster, trans. Alice Webster (Saint John, N.B., 1936).
J. C. Webster, Thomas Pichon, “the spy of Beausejour,” an account of his career in Europe and America . . . ([Sackville, N.B.], 1937).

In fiction 
Thomas Pichon's life is the inspiration for a series of novels by Canadian historian and novelist A. J. B. Johnston.
 EPUB 978-1-77206-022-5, Kindle 978-1-77206-023-2, Web pdf 978-1-77206-021-8
 EPUB 978-1-927492-71-0, MOBI 978-1-927492-72-7 
 EPUB 978-1-897009-89-5, MOBI 978-1-897009-90-1

1700 births
1781 deaths
People from Vire
People of Father Le Loutre's War
French expatriates in the Kingdom of Great Britain
18th-century spies
French spies